The 1984 Star World Championships were held in Vilamoura, Portugal in 1984.

Results

References

Star World Championships
1984 in sailing
Sailing competitions in Portugal